The Dominate, also known as the late Roman Empire, is the name sometimes given to the "despotic" later phase of imperial government in the ancient Roman Empire. It followed the earlier period known as the "Principate". Until the empire was reunited in 313, this phase is more often called the Tetrarchy.

It may begin with the commencement of the reign of Diocletian in AD 284, following the Third Century Crisis of AD 235–284, and to end in the west with the fall of the Western Roman Empire in AD 476, while in the east its end is disputed, with the majority of opinions placing it around the transition between the Justinian and Heraclian dynasties, between the years 565 and 641. In form, the Dominate is considered to have been more authoritarian, less collegial and more bureaucratic than the Principate from which it emerged.

Etymology 
The modern term dominate is derived from the Latin dominus, which translates into English as lord or master. Dominus, traditionally used by Roman slaves to address their masters, was sporadically used in addressing emperors throughout the Principate, usually in the form of excessive flattery (or political invective) when referring to the emperor. Augustus actively discouraged the practice, and Tiberius in particular is said to have reviled it as sycophancy. Domitian encouraged its use, but none of the emperors used the term in any semi-official capacity until the reign of Aurelian in AD 274, where coins were issued bearing the inscription deus et dominus natus.

However, it was only under Diocletian that the term dominus was adopted as part of the emperor's official titulature, forming part of Diocletian's radical reforms.

Transition from the Principate 
The Dominate system of government emerged as a response to the 50 years of chaos that is referred to as the Crisis of the Third Century. The stresses and strains of those years (chronic usurpations, military insurrections, simultaneous military conflicts across multiple frontiers) exposed the weaknesses in the Roman state under the Principate, and saw a gradual movement from the collegiate model of government that existed prior to AD 235 to a more formally autocratic version that begins after AD 285. In broad terms, it saw the gradual exclusion of the senatorial elite from high military commands and the parallel elevation of the equestrian orders, the reorganisation of the armed forces and the creation of mobile field armies, changes in imperial dress and ceremonial displays, a religious policy aiming at religious unity, large scale monetary reforms, and the creation of an empire-wide civil bureaucracy.

Although Diocletian is commonly thought of as creator of the Dominate, its origins lie in the innovations of earlier emperors, principally those undertaken by Aurelian (AD 270–275). Some reforms stretch back to the reigns of Gallienus (AD 253–268) and Trajan (AD 98–117), during whose reign "knights were given an escalating importance in the administration of Rome and the empire." Not all the changes that produced the 'Dominate' were completed by the time of Diocletian's abdication in AD 305; many changes were either introduced or modified by Constantine I. Consequently, just as the Principate emerged over the period 31 BC through to 14 AD, it is only by AD 337 that the reforms that resulted in the Dominate were largely complete.

In the opinion of the historian John Bagnall Bury, the system of government,
constructed with the most careful attention to details, was a solution of the formidable problem of holding together a huge heterogeneous empire, threatened with dissolution and bankruptcy, an empire which was far from being geographically compact and had four long, as well as several smaller, frontiers to defend. To govern a large state by two independent but perfectly similar machines, controlled not from one centre but from two foci, without sacrificing its unity was an interesting and entirely new experiment. These bureaucratic machines worked moderately well, and their success might have been extraordinary if the monarchs who directed them had always been men of superior ability. Blots of course and defects there were, especially in the fields of economy and finance. The political creation of the Illyrian Emperors was not unworthy of the genius of Rome.

Characteristics

Multiple emperors 
Under the Principate, the position of emperor saw the concentration of various civil and military offices within a single magistracy. Augustus and his successors usually took great care to disguise the autocratic nature of the office by hiding behind the institutions of the Roman Republic and the fiction that the emperor was simply the princeps or first citizen, whose authority was granted by the Senate. This role was almost always filled by a single individual, and the date that the Potestas tribunicia was conferred onto that person was the point when imperial authority could be exercised. Over the course of the Principate, it became common for the emperor (or Augustus) to nominate an heir (referred to as the Caesar), but the caesar did not have access to the powers of the emperor, nor was he delegated any official authority.

It was during the Crisis of the Third Century that the traditional imperial approach of a single imperial magistrate based at Rome became unable to cope with multiple and simultaneous invasions and usurpations that required the emperor to be everywhere at once. Further, it was their absence which caused usurpations to occur in response to a local or provincial crisis that traditionally would have been dealt with by the emperor.

Under the Dominate, the burden of the imperial position was increasingly shared between colleagues, referred to as the Consortium imperii. It was Diocletian who introduced this form of government, under a system called the Tetrarchy, which originally consisted of two co-emperors (augusti) and two respectively subordinate junior emperors (caesars), each of whom shared in the imperial power. This original power sharing model lasted from AD 289 through to AD 324, being undone during the Civil wars of the Tetrarchy. With Constantine I's death in AD 337, the empire was again shared between multiple augusti, lasting until AD 350. The model became a permanent feature of the empire in AD 364 with the accession of Valentinian I, who shared the imperial office with his brother Valens. Barring the 3-year period of solitary rule by Theodosius I from AD 392–395, this approach would last until the overthrow of the last western emperor in AD 476.

While each augustus was autonomous within each portion of the empire they managed, all laws that were introduced by any emperor were valid across the entirety of the empire.

Devaluation of the Consulate 
During the Roman Republic, the office of Consul was the highest elected magistracy in the Roman state, with two consuls elected annually. With the arrival of the Principate, although all real power was invested in the emperor, the consuls were still in theory the head of state, and the calendar year was identified by the two ordinary consuls who began in office at the start of the year. Throughout the Principate, the imperial consulate was an important position, albeit as the method through which the Roman aristocracy could progress through to the higher levels of imperial administration – only former consuls could become consular legates, the proconsuls of Africa and Asia, or the urban prefect of Rome.

Consequently, the high regard placed upon the ordinary consulate remained intact, as it was one of the few offices that one could share with the emperor, and during this period it was filled mostly by patricians or by individuals who had consular ancestors. It was a post that would be occupied by a man halfway through his career, in his early thirties for a patrician, or in his early forties for most others. If they were especially skilled or valued, they may even have achieved a second (or rarely, a third) consulate. Prior to achieving the consulate, these individuals already had a significant career behind them, and would expect to continue serving the state, filling in the post upon which the state functioned.

Under the Dominate, the loss of many pre-consular functions and the encroachment of the equites into the traditional senatorial administrative and military functions meant that senatorial careers virtually vanished prior to their appointment as consuls. This had the effect of seeing a suffect consulship granted at an earlier age, to the point that by the 4th century, it was being held by men in their early twenties, and possibly younger. As time progressed, second consulates, usually ordinary, became far more common than had been the case during the first two centuries, while the first consulship was usually a suffect consulate. Also, the consulate during this period was no longer just the province of senators – the automatic awarding of a suffect consulship to the equestrian praetorian prefects (who were given the ornamenta consularia upon achieving their office) allowed them to style themselves cos. II when they were later granted an ordinary consulship by the emperor. All this had the effect of further devaluing the office of consul, to the point that by time of the Dominate, holding an ordinary consulate was occasionally left out of the cursus inscriptions, while suffect consulships were hardly ever recorded.

Transformation of the traditional Senatorial order

One of the key changes in the management of the empire during the Dominate was the large scale removal of old-style senatorial participation in administrative and military functions. The process began with the reforms of Gallienus, who removed senators from military commands, placing them in the hands of the Equites.

Under Diocletian, the military equestrian transformation was taken a stage further, with the removal of hereditary senators from most administrative, as well as military, posts (such as the Legatus legionis). Hereditary senators were limited to administrative jobs in Italy and a few neighbouring provinces (Sicily, Africa, Achaea and Asia), despite the fact that senior administrative posts had been greatly multiplied by the tripling of the number of provinces and the establishment of dioceses (or super-provinces). The exclusion of the old Italian aristocracy, both senatorial and equestrian, from the political and military power that they had monopolised for many centuries was largely complete. The Senate became politically insignificant, although it retained great prestige.

Constantine I, however, re-introduced a limited form of senatorial career, basing the magistracies on previous offices but with changed functions. Beginning with the quaestorship, a role which had acted as a form of apprenticeship for an ambitious senator during the Principate, it was downgraded during the Dominate and assigned to the sons of senators, with the legal qualifying age lowered to sixteen. This was followed by a suffect consulship and/or a praetorship. The office of Praetor had also lost much of its influence, as it had been stripped of its legal functions, so that during the Dominate its purpose was primarily to organise the Ludi Romani.

The most prestigious post that a senator could hold under the Dominate was that of Praefectus urbi; during this period the office gained in effective power, as the imperial court was removed from the city of Rome, meaning that the prefects were no longer under the emperor's direct supervision. The most significant change was the return of provincial government to the senatorial order, with the larger or more important provinces handed over to those senators who had held an ordinary consulship. However, unlike the time of the Principate, the role of governor was much reduced, being a purely civil magistrate with no military functions, and with provinces greatly reduced in size, and the number increasing from the roughly fifty pre-existing provinces to approximately one hundred.

The decline in the functions carried out by the old aristocratic senatorial families acting collegially with the emperor in the running of the empire was offset by the rise of an expanded imperial bureaucracy who served the emperor in a subordinate role. Interposed between the governors and the emperors was the Vicarius and, above him, the Praetorian Prefect, both of which were civilian (non-military) roles. Gone was the division between provinces under the jurisdiction of the Senate and those under the authority of the emperor during the Principate. Now all provinces, dioceses, and the Praetorian prefecture were under the authority of the emperor. The Praetorian Prefects had wide-ranging administrative, financial, judicial and legislative powers. The provincial governors were appointed at his recommendation, and with him rested their dismissal, subject to the Emperor's approval. The only civilian officials not under the direct oversight of the Praetorian Prefects were the proconsular governors of Africa, Achaea and Asia, along with the Urban Prefects.

The increasing administrative machinery surrounding the emperor resulted in an explosion of bureaucratic offices. These state officials were paid originally both in food and with money, but over the course of the Dominate, the annona (or food ration) was converted into money. Their salaries therefore consumed a considerable chunk of the imperial budget. Although precise numbers are not available, it has been speculated that the state bureaucracy in the Praetorian prefecture of the East and the Praetorian prefecture of Illyricum, including the diocesan and provincial governor's staffs, would have consisted of somewhere around 10,000 individuals. This figure did not include the staff of the military commanders, or the financial and other central ministries, and contrasts with the estimated 300 state bureaucrats that were employed across all the provinces during the period of the Julio-Claudian emperors.

Among the most important offices under the Dominate were the:
 Quaestor sacri palatii (the officer responsible for drafting the laws, and the Imperial rescripts responding to petitions)
 Magister officiorum (officer responsible for managing the secretarial departments in the palace, the conduct of court ceremonies, and controlling the special department which dealt with ceremonial arrangements and Imperial audiences)
 Magistri scriniorum (the emperor's secretaries, belonging to the memoriae, epistularum, and libellorum bureaus)
 Praepositus sacri cubiculi (the emperor's chamberlain, who exercised a general authority over all officers associated with the imperial court).

All important offices automatically carried with them admission into the Senate, thereby further eroding the standing of the traditional aristocratic Senatorial families of the Principate under the Dominate. This resulted in a senatorial body of around 2,000 members during the reign of Constantine, and these numbers only increased when there were two senatorial bodies in existence, one at Rome and one at Constantinople.

All the higher officials in the imperial bureaucracy belonged to one of the three classes or ranks introduced by Constantine I – the illustres, spectabiles and clarissimi, all of whom were automatically members of the senatorial order. The heads of the great central civil ministries,  the magistri militum and other high level military commanders as well as the Praepositus sacri cubiculi were all graded as illustres, the highest of the new senatorial ranks. The second class (spectabiles) was assigned to a large group of civil servants, including the Proconsuls, vicarii, the military governors in the provinces and the magistri scriniorum.

The entry level class, clarissimus, was the minimum qualification for membership of the Senate. It was automatically awarded as part of the governorship of a province, and to a myriad of other lesser officers. It was held by a large number of junior imperial public servants, as well as being awarded to them after their retirement. The generosity of the emperors in bestowing the clarissimus witnessed the gradual erosion in its value. As a consequence, the emperors began to raise many clarissimi graded officials to the rank of spectabiles, which in turn cheapened the highest rank of illustres. This inflationary pressure resulted in the creation of a new senatorial rank before the middle of the 6th century, that of gloriosi. Higher in grading than the illustres, all of the highest state officials were regraded to this rank.

Military reforms

Under the Principate, provinces that contained legions were under the proconsular authority of the emperor, who managed those provinces through designated legates (Legatus Augusti pro praetore), while the units stationed at Rome were under the authority of the Praetorian Prefect. During the Crisis of the Third Century, greater authority over imperial military matters was ceded to the Praetorian Prefects,  while the imperial legates took advantage of weakened centralised authority to use the troops under their command to rebel against the emperor and claim the imperial title for themselves.

It was Diocletian who initially divided the military administrative apparatus and the civil administration in order to mitigate the risk that future imperial governors or Praetorian Prefects might attempt to seize the throne through force, and then he reorganized both of them.  During the Tetrarchy, the Praetorian Prefects were the Emperor's top administrators, ranking just below the Emperor himself in dignity. While initially serving as the Emperor's second in command in all matters of imperial administration (military, civil, judicial, taxation, etc.), during the course of the Dominate the Prefects gradually had portions of their authority stripped from them and given to other offices: the Masters of the Soldiers for military affairs and the Imperial Chancellor for central civilian administration. These reforms were the result of both the lack of officials suitable for the prefect's wide-ranging tasks, and of the desire to reduce the potential challenge to the Emperor's authority posed by a powerful Prefect.

The next reforms were undertaken by Constantine I, who reorganised the supreme military command. Two significant parts of the reform are apparent: the separation of military commanders from civil administration and the division of the army into two classes: the Field Armies ("comitatenses") and the Frontier Troops ("limitanei").  The Field Armies served as the Empire's strategic reserve to respond to crisis where it may arise whereas the Frontier Troops were permanently stationed along the Empire's borders ("limes"). Recruited from the ranks of the Field Armies were the Palace Troops units ("Palatini"), who accompanied the Emperor as he travelled around the Empire, functioning as the successor to the Principate's Praetorian Guard.

Around the same time, Constantine established the new military roles of the Master of the Soldiers ("Magister Militum"), who were the supreme military commanders of the empire. Beginning with the head of the foot troops, the magister peditum ("Master of the Foot"), and one for the more prestigious horse troops, the magister equitum ("Master of the Horse"), these were established in each of the four Praetorian Prefectures. Over time, the numbers and types of Masters would vary across the empire. The establishment of solely military officials provided for a more professional military leadership. The Masters were all ranked as illustres.

Within the East, by the late 4th century, there were Masters of the Soldiers, per Illyricum, per Thracias , and per Orientem. Each of these three Masters exercised independent command over one of the three Field Armies of the Eastern Empire. There were also two Masters of the Soldiers in the Presence (in praesenti) who accompanied the Eastern Emperor and who each commanded half of the Palace Troops. Each of the five Masters were of equal rank.
Within the West, there were originally four Masters of the Soldiers; foot and horse per Gallias and per Italiam. Over time, it became more common for the offices (foot and horse) to be combined under a single person, then styled magister equitum et peditum or magister utriusquae militiae ("master of both forces"). By the time of Stilicho, the Master of Both Services was the supreme military commander of the West, ranking only below the Emperor and above all other military commanders, and commander of half the Palace Troops. The Master of the Horse held command over half the Palace Troops and the Field Army of Gaul, but still under the command of the Master of Both Services.

To support the Masters of the Soldiers, the Empire established several Military Counts ("Comes rei militaris"). There were six such Military Counts throughout the Empire. The Military Counts were all ranked as spectabiles.

Within the East, there was only one Military Count: the Military Count of Egypt ("Comes rei militaris Aegypti"). Unlike the Military Counts of the West, this Count commanded the Frontier Troops stationed in Egypt and reported directly to the Eastern Emperor.
Within the West, there were six such Military Counts, one for each of the five Field Armies in Illyria, Africa, Tingitania, Hispania, and Britannia. The sixth military count, the Count of the Saxon Shore ("comes littoris Saxonici per Britanniam"), commanded Frontier Troops along both sides of the English Channel and reported to the Count of Britannia. The five regular Military Counts reported to the Master of Both Services.

The various Frontier Troops were under the command of Dukes ("duces limitis" or "border commanders"). These commanders were the closest in function to the Imperial Legates of the Principate. Most Dukes were given command of forces in a single province, but a few controlled more than one province. In the East, the Dukes reported to the Master of the Soldiers of their district whereas in the West they reported to their respective Military Count.

Religious reforms
The Dominate saw enormous changes in the official religion of the empire from its pantheistic Principate origins. Its principal feature was the elevation of a supreme deity that all peoples in the empire were to worship. According to John Bagnall Bury,
"while in all ancient monarchies religion and sacerdotalism were a political as well as a social power, the position of the Christian Church in the Roman Empire was a new thing in the world, presenting problems of a kind with which no ruler had hitherto been confronted and to which no past experience offered a key. The history of the Empire would have been profoundly different if the Church had remained as independent of the State as it had been before Constantine. But heresies and schisms and religious intolerance on one side, and the despotic instinct to control all social forces on the other, brought about a close union between State and Church which altered the character and spirit of the State, and constituted perhaps the most striking difference between the early and the later Empire."

The origins of the change began in the reign of Aurelian, who promoted the worship of Sol Invictus as the supreme deity of the empire. Although the worship of Sol Invictus did not remove the veneration towards the traditional Roman gods, it was seen as a mark of imperial favouritism, and the emperors linked his cult to the well-being of the state and on-going military victories of the empire.

Next, it was during Diocletian's reign that emperor worship was fully adopted by the emperors, as a method of expressing loyalty to the state. Previously, deceased emperors had been worshiped as divus across the empire. Living emperors had been worshiped as gods in the eastern half of the empire since the time of Augustus, but this was not officially encouraged during the Principate, and it was not introduced into Italy. It was Diocletian who altered this to have the worship of the living emperors as an official part of the religious framework of the entire empire. To facilitate this, Diocletian was linked to the god Jupiter, while his colleague Maximian was associated with Hercules.

It was under Constantine I that the religious transformation began to take its late Dominate shape, initially with Constantine officially favouring the worship of a single deity in the shape of Sol Invictus. During the course of his reign, the identification of Sol Invictus as the principal god began to merge with the Christian god. To avoid offending Christians, Constantine abandoned the emperor's formal claim to divinity and ceased to demand sacrifices to the emperor that formed part of the imperial cult. In an attempt to appeal to both Christians and pagans, Constantine adopted two new religious symbols into the imperial iconography, in the form of the Chi Rho and the Labarum. By the time of Constantine's death in AD 337, this process was largely complete, with Constantine being baptized on his deathbed.

At the Imperial court, Christians began indiscernibly to rise in favour, to the detriment of pagans. This did not begin to immediately hamper the advancement of pagan courtiers after the defeat of Maxentius in 312, as the full effects were not visible until paganism was prohibited at the end of the 4th century. Ultimately, however, as a result of the imperial patronage of Constantine and especially his sons, Christianity rapidly emerged as the official religion of the empire, although many vestiges of the imperial cult took some time to pass (such as the Emperors still assuming the role of Pontifex Maximus, chief priest of the pagan cults, until AD 381).

By the time of Theodosius I, the organisation of the Imperial Church had aligned to the civil administration of the empire. Every city had a bishop, every province had a metropolitan, and every civil diocese had an exarch. At the level of the Praetorian Prefectures sat the five Patriarchates. The Bishop of Rome's authority extended over the whole western or Latin half of the Empire, and included the Praetorian prefecture of Illyricum. The Patriarchate of Constantinople had oversight over the civil dioceses of Thrace, Pontus, and Asia. The Patriarchate of Alexandria corresponded to the Diocese of Egypt. The Patriarchate of Antioch had jurisdiction over the majority of the Praetorian prefecture of the East, while the smaller Patriarchate of Jerusalem dominated the three Palestinian provinces.

The emperors had, over time, conceded many privileges to the clergy and the churches. Firstly, all clergy, like the holders of the pagan religious offices, were exempted from taxation. There were no restrictions placed on churches receiving bequests through wills, and they were given the same rights as the pagan temples had in granting asylum to any who requested it. Bishops were permitted to act as judges in civil cases when both parties had agreed, and no appeal was permitted once the Bishop had made their ruling. The state made increasing use of the ecclesiastical authorities in local administration due to the decline in the civic life of the urban communities, which coincided with the increasing local influence of the bishops. Finally, bishops were given the same role as the defensor civitatis, who was responsible for protecting the poor against exploitation by government officials and defending them from other powerful individuals, during the course of which the bishop could bring cases of illegality directly to the emperor.

Downgrading of Rome as capital of the empire
One of the most visible signs of the changes brought about by the Dominate was the downgrading of Rome from its status as the official residence of the emperor. This precedent had already been established by Gallienus in 260, who moved the imperial court to Mediolanum in response to a suspected future attack by the usurper Postumus as well as defending Italy from the ravages of the Alamanni.

Rome was increasingly seen to be too distant a residence for the emperor when troubles could erupt along any of the borders of the empire. In the west, Mediolanum was seen to be a much better strategic city for the emperor to be based at, as it gave good access through the Alps northwards to both the Danubian provinces in the east as well as the Rhine provinces and Gaul to the west. Further, it was well positioned to guard against incursions through the alpine passes. This decision was confirmed when Diocletian established the Tetrarchy, and his colleague Maximian informally established Mediolanum as the senior western emperor's official residence. Diocletian, conscious that the Persian threat to the eastern provinces required a continuous imperial presence, placed his eastern capital in the city of Nicomedia. Meanwhile, the Caesars also had imperial residences – Constantius Chlorus was based at Augusta Treverorum, while Galerius sited his residence at Sirmium.

After the collapse of the Tetrachy, Constantine I at first placed his imperial capital at Ulpia Serdica before erecting a new imperial capital on the site of the old Greek city of Byzantium. Naming it Constantinople, it finally replaced Nicomedia as the site of the emperor's residence in the east in 330. Constantinople would remain the capital of the eastern provinces throughout the period of the Dominate.

In the west, Mediolanum continued to be the imperial residence until the repeated invasions by Alaric I forced the western emperor Honorius to relocate to the strongly fortified city of Ravenna in 402. Ravenna remained the western imperial capital until the loss of Italy in 476. Although Rome was reincorporated into the empire by Justinian I in 540, it was Ravenna which was selected as the official residence of the Exarch, the governor who represented the emperor in Italy. Ravenna would retain this position until 751, when the Byzantine Empire finally lost the central Italian provinces to the Lombards.

Intensification of coloni use and the origins of serfdom 

Large Roman landowners increasingly relied on Roman freemen, acting as tenant farmers to provide labor.

The status of these tenant farmers, eventually known as coloni, steadily eroded.   Because the tax system implemented by Diocletian (reigned 284-305)  assessed taxes based both on land and on the inhabitants of that land, it became administratively inconvenient for peasants to leave the land where the census counted them.

Starting in 332 AD, Emperor Constantine issued legislation that greatly restricted the rights of the coloni and tied them to the land. Coloni and lower-ranking plebeians were no longer allowed to change their occupation. Ultimately, with the Fall of Rome, non-Patrician Roman citizens themselves would find themselves displaced and would become serfs.

Stylistic changes
Diocletian and his augusti colleagues and successors openly displayed the naked face of Imperial power. They ceased using the more modest title of princeps; they adopted the veneration of the potentates of ancient Egypt and Persia; and, they started wearing jeweled robes and shoes in contrast to the simple toga praetexta used by Emperors of the Principate.

Emperors inhabited luxurious palaces (the ruins of Diocletian's enormous palace in Dalmatia survive to this day; see Diocletian's Palace) and were surrounded by a court of individuals who, only due to the favor and proximity of the Emperor, attained the highest honorific titles and bureaucratic functions. In fact, many offices associated with the palatine life and that suggested intimate relationship with royalty eventually developed connotations of power, such as the offices of Chamberlain and Constable. The titles of Senator and Consul, after the loss of every residue of political power they had had in the Principate, became mere honorifics in the later Empire.

Historian David Potter describes the transformation of government under Diocletian when describing the shifts in imagery the Emperor used to display his power (in this case the building of a huge new palace at Sirmium):

The style of Government so memorably described by Marcus, whereby the emperor sought to show himself as a model of correct aristocratic deportment, had given way to a style in which the emperor was seen to be distinct from all other mortals. His house could no longer be a grander version of houses that other people might live in: it, like him, had to be different.

The adoption of Dominus as a formal title reflected the divine status (divus) that has come to be a prerogative of the Imperial position. Originally an exceptional honour awarded by the Senate to an Emperor posthumously, the elevation had devolved to an expected convention for still-living Caesars. To dissuade the rebellions and usurpations of the Crisis of the Third Century, the Emperors sought the kind of divine legitimacy invoked by Eastern monarchies.

Emperors imported rituals such as kneeling before the Emperor, and kissing of the hem of the Imperial robe (proskynesis). Even some Christian emperors, such as Constantine, were venerated after death. In the Eastern Roman Empire after 476 AD, the symbiotic relation between the Imperial Crown in Constantinople and the Eastern Orthodox Church led to the distinctive character of the medieval Roman state. Anastasius I was the last emperor known to be consecrated as divus on his death (518 AD). The title appears to have been abandoned thereafter on grounds of its spiritual impropriety (see Imperial cult of ancient Rome for more on the divinity of Roman leaders). The last ruler to use the titles Dominus Noster was Justinian I (died 565), giving place to the title of Basileus ("King"). In the Eastern half of the Empire, and especially from the time of Justinian I, the system of the Dominate evolved into autocratic absolutism.

In contrast to the situation in the Principate, however, emperors in the Dominate could not be deified as it was, excepting the two initial decades and the reign of Julian, the Christian period of the Roman Empire.

Another clear symptom of the upgrading of the imperial status was the notion of the emperor as an incarnation of the majesty of Rome; thus lèse majesté became high treason.

See also

 Constitution of the Late Roman Empire

References

Further reading
 
 Carson, Robert. 1981. Principal Coins of the Romans, III: The Dominate, A.D. 294–498. London: Brit. Museum Publ.
 Elton, Hugh. 2018. The Roman Empire in Late Antiquity, A Political and Military History.   Cambridge:  Cambridge University Press. 
 Hebblewhite, Mark  2017. The Emperor and the Army in the Later Roman Empire, AD 235–395.   London; New York:  Routledge. 
 Kelly, Christopher 2004. Ruling the Later Roman Empire.   Cambridge, MA:  Harvard University Press. 
 Kulikowski, Michael. 2016. The Triumph of Empire: The Roman World from Hadrian to Constantine. Cambridge: Harvard University Press.
 Melounová, Markéta. 2012. "Trials with Religious and Political Charges from the Principate to the Dominate." Sborník Prací Filosofické Fakulty Brnenské University = Studia minora Facultatis Philosophicae Universitatis Brunensis. Rada archeologicko-klasicka = Series archaeologica et classica. 17.2: 117–130.
 Minamikawa, Takashi ed. 2015. New Approaches to the later Roman Empire. Kyoto: Kyoto University.
 Roymans, Nico, Stijn Heeren, and Wim de Clerq eds. 2016. Social Dynamics in the Northwest Frontiers of the Late Roman Empire: Beyond Transformation or Decline. Amsterdam archaeological studies, 26.   Amsterdam:  Amsterdam University Press.
 Vitiello, Massimiliano. 2015. "Blaming the Late Republic: Senatorial Ideology and Republican Institutions in Late Antiquity." Classical Receptions Journal 7.1: 31–45.

Roman Empire in late antiquity
Government of the Roman Empire
3rd century in the Roman Empire
4th century in the Roman Empire
5th century in the Roman Empire